Bugyly Nature Reserve is a protected area in the Kazakh Uplands, Kazakhstan. Administratively it is located in the Shet District of the Karaganda Region.

Description
The landscape is made up of flat or undulating steppe, as well as two mountain ranges of moderate altitude. The vegetation includes low shrub and grasses, such as meadowsweet, Siberian peashrub, wormwood and feather grass. In the narrow river gorges birch, aspen, willow and raspberry thickets may be found. Among the animals protected by the reserve, the roe deer, deer, hare, badger, wolf, fox, grouse and partridge deserve mention.

See also
Kazakh Steppe

References

External links

Bugyly mountain oasis

Nature reserves in Kazakhstan
Karaganda Region
Kazakh Uplands